David Harker (October 19, 1906 – February 27, 1991) was an American medical researcher who according to The New York Times  was "a pioneer in the use of X-rays to decipher the structure of critical substances in the life process of cells".

He is also well known for Harker–Kasper inequalities (statistical relationships between the phases of structure factors), which he devised in collaboration with John S. Kasper.
Harker made seminal discoveries in the field of chemical crystallography.

His lab solved the structure of the pancreatic enzyme ribonuclease A, the third protein structure ever solved by protein crystallography.
Harker was a member of the National Academy of Sciences,
director of the protein structure program at the Polytechnic Institute of Brooklyn, director of the Center for Crystallographic Research at Roswell Park Comprehensive Cancer Center, and the head of the crystallography division of General Electric. After retirement from Roswell Park in 1976, he joined the Hauptman-Woodward Medical Research Institute (HWI), then known as the Medical Foundation of Buffalo. He remained there until his death in 1991. His research interests while at HWI turned towards mathematical aspects of crystallography, including color space groups and infinite polyhedra.

Harker was awarded the Gregori Aminoff Prize from the Swedish Academy in 1984.

References

External links

 Herbert A. Hauptman, "David Harker", Biographical Memoirs of the National Academy of Sciences (1998)

1922 births
1991 deaths
American biophysicists
Members of the United States National Academy of Sciences
Polytechnic Institute of New York University faculty